Mark Oluwafemi Williams (born December 16, 2001) is an American professional basketball player for the Charlotte Hornets of the National Basketball Association (NBA), drafted as 15th overall pick in the first round. He played college basketball for the Duke Blue Devils.

High school career
Williams began his high school basketball career at Norfolk Academy. He was invited to the NBA Top 100 camp in Charlottesville, Virginia in the summer of 2018. Williams passed the 1,000 point threshold in February 2019. As a junior, he averaged 19.7 points, 11.2 rebounds and 3.7 blocks per game to help the Bulldogs reach the VISAA state tournament. He was selected to the USA Today All-USA Virginia Boys Basketball second team. During the 2019 Nike EYBL, Williams averaged 14.8 points, 8.9 rebounds and 2.1 blocks per game, while shooting 63.8% from the floor. During the Nike Peach Jam in July 2019, Williams averaged 23.5 points, 12 rebounds and 2.5 blocks per game while shooting 76.0 percent in two games for the Boo Williams program. Coming into his senior season, he transferred to IMG Academy, which finished the previous season as the GEICO Nationals champions. Williams was named a 2020 McDonald's All-American. On January 31, 2020, he posted 19 points and 16 rebounds in a 64–62 win over Hillcrest Prep.

Recruiting
Williams was considered a five-star recruit by 247Sports and Rivals, and a four-star recruit by ESPN. On November 1, 2019, he committed to playing college basketball for Duke, choosing the Blue Devils over Michigan and UCLA after taking official visits to all three schools. Williams chose Duke in large part due to the possibility for a national championship, and said he wants to pattern his game after Wendell Carter Jr.

College career 
Before the start of the season, Williams was named to the Kareem Abdul-Jabbar Award preseason watch list. On January 30, 2021, he scored 11 points and grabbed 5 rebounds in a 79–53 win over Clemson. On February 13, 2021, Williams recorded 13 points and 5 blocks in a 69–53 victory against NC State. On February 22, 2021, he tallied 18 points and 11 rebounds in a 85–71 win over Syracuse. On March 10, 2021, Williams recorded another double-double of 23 points and 19 rebounds in a 70–56 victory against Louisville in the second round of the ACC tournament. In that game his 19 rebounds set a record for the most ever by a freshman in the ACC Tournament, surpassing former Virginia center and NBA Hall of Famer Ralph Sampson's 18 rebounds against Clemson in the 1980 ACC Tournament and ranking the third highest for a freshman at Duke. As a freshman, Williams averaged 7.1 points and 4.5 rebounds per game. On February 26, 2022, he scored a career-high 28 points in a 97–72 win over Syracuse. Williams was named ACC Defensive Player of the Year as well as Third Team All-ACC as a sophomore. As a sophomore, he averaged 11.2 points, 7.4 rebounds and 2.8 blocks per game. On April 18, 2022, Williams declared for the 2022 NBA Draft, forgoing his remaining college eligibility.

Professional career

Charlotte Hornets (2022–present) 
Williams was selected in the 2022 NBA draft with the 15th overall pick by the Charlotte Hornets. 

On February 10, 2023, after the team's starting center, Mason Plumlee, was traded, Williams earned his first career start and posted a double-double with 11 points and 12 rebounds in a loss to the Boston Celtics. On February 25, 2023, Williams put up a career-high 18 points and a career-high 20 rebounds in a 108–103 win over the Miami Heat.

Career statistics

College

|-
| style="text-align:left;"| 2020–21
| style="text-align:left;"| Duke
| 23 || 15 || 15.2 || .664 || – || .537 || 4.5 || .7 || .6 || 1.4 || 7.1
|-
| style="text-align:left;"| 2021–22
| style="text-align:left;"| Duke
| 39 || 39 || 23.6 || .721 || .000 || .727 || 7.4 || .9 || .5 || 2.8 || 11.2
|- class="sortbottom"
| style="text-align:center;" colspan="2"| Career
| 62 || 54 || 20.5 || .704 || .000 || .661 || 6.3 || .8 || .5 || 2.3 || 9.7

Personal life
Born to Nigerian parents, Margaret and Dr. Alex Williams, on December 16, 2001. His father is a physician with subspecialty in Gastroenterology. Williams' older sister, Elizabeth, played college basketball at Duke from 2011 to 2015 before being selected fourth in the 2015 WNBA draft.

References

External links
Duke Blue Devils bio

2001 births
Living people
American men's basketball players
Basketball players from Norfolk, Virginia
Centers (basketball)
Charlotte Hornets draft picks
Charlotte Hornets players
Duke Blue Devils men's basketball players
Greensboro Swarm players
IMG Academy alumni
McDonald's High School All-Americans